Get What You Need is a 2003 studio album by an Irish power pop/punk rock band The Undertones. It is the band's first collection of new studio material since their reformation with new lead singer Paul McLoone, which occurred in November 1999. Allmusic stated in their review that "It's almost unthinkable, really, that Derry's fabled good-time teen punks of yesteryear would record and continue... let alone that their output would be anything less than embarrassing." The website also stated that "you have everything you need for a complete escape to more innocent, drunken, loutish times with a smile on the faces of everyone in your immediate vicinity" and recommended the album. Uncut Magazine gave a favorable review as well, remarking that its songs "inhabit the same ageless corner of garage band heaven as earlier classics". In contrast, Blender gave it two stars out of five—'mediocre'—and stated that "they sound more like a road-toughened bar band".

Tracks from this album and follow up Dig Yourself Deep were remastered for the compilation Dig What You Need in 2022.

Track listing

Personnel
The Undertones
 Paul McLoone - lead vocals
 John O'Neill - guitar, backing vocals
 Damian O'Neill - guitar, keyboards, backing vocals
 Michael Bradley - bass, backing vocals
 Billy Doherty - drums

References
 

2003 albums
The Undertones albums
Sanctuary Records albums